Kovilur is a village in the Orathanadu taluk of Thanjavur district, Tamil Nadu, India.

Demographics 
According to the 2001 census, Kovilur had a total population of 2428 with 1203 males and 1225 females. The sex ratio was 1018. The literacy rate was 69.15.

References 
 

Villages in Thanjavur district